Chungkhokai Doungel is an Indian politician. Doungel is a prominent Kuki leader, and has served as Minister in different coalition government in the state of Manipur.

Doungel and his sons have survived various assassination attempts. He limps after having suffered an injury to his leg. His wife was blinded by a bomb sent to her on 7 July 1995.

Doungel was fielded by the NCP as its candidate in the Outer Manipur seat in the 2014 Indian general election. His candidature was supported seven parties from the Left and Secular Alliance; the Communist Party of India, the Communist Party of India (Marxist), the Revolutionary Socialist Party, the All India Forward Bloc, the Janata Dal (Secular), the Shiv Sena and the Bahujan Samaj Party. The NCP organized the launching ceremony of Doungel's election campaign at his private residence Sanjenthong. Amongst the other political parties that took part in the ceremony were the CPI and CPI(M).

References

Candidates in the 2014 Indian general election
Living people
Nationalist Congress Party politicians from Manipur
Year of birth missing (living people)